Stephen (or Étienne) II (died after 22 July 1173) from the House of Ivrea was Count of Auxonne (1173–1237). He was Stephen II in his House and Stephen I as count of Auxonne.

He was the son of William III, count of Mâcon, Vienne and Auxonne and Adelaide-Pontia, heiress of Trier.

His brother was Geraud; the two brothers succeeded their father on 1156. Geraud inherited the counties of Mâcon and Vienne and Stephen II received the county of Auxonne from William III and the lordship of Traves from his mother. 

He died after 22 July 1173 and he succeeded by his only child, Stephen III.

Issue
He married c. 1170 to Judith, daughter of Matthias I, Duke of Lorraine and he had:
 Stephen III of Auxonne (d.1241) married Beatrix, countess of Chalon

References

Sources

Anscarids